Traveller was a French prize that entered British records in 1804. She initially traded between Plymouth and Italy and then from 1805 made two voyages as whaler in the British southern whale fishery. Although the registers continued to list her as whaling after 1806 until 1813, she does not appear during this period in Lloyd's Lists ship arrival and departure data.

Career
Traveller first entered the Register of Shipping in 1804 (RS), and Lloyd's Register (LR) in 1805.

On 2 March 1804, Traveler, Vavasor, master, arrived at Gibraltar from Plymouth. On 3 November she arrived at Plymouth from Leghorn.

On 15 October 1805 Travellor, Vavasor, master, sailed from Gravesend, bound for the South Seas.

The British vessels dispersed and Lark, Traveller, and four of the merchantmen escaped. It was not clear what had happened to Atlantic.

Traveller, Rosser, master, was next reported to have sailed on 7 November 1806 from Deal, bound for the South Seas. This was the last report in Lloyd's List of her arrival or departure.

Citations

1800s ships
ships built in France
Captured ships
Age of Sail merchant ships of England
Whaling ships